The 1956 All-Atlantic Coast Conference football team consists of American football players chosen by various selectors for their All-Atlantic Coast Conference ("ACC") teams for the 1956 NCAA University Division football season. Selectors in 1956 included the Associated Press (AP) and United Press (UP). Players named to the first team by both the AP and UP are listed below in bold.

All-Atlantic Coast selections

Ends
 Buddy Bass, Duke (AP-1, UP-1)
 Buddy Frick, South Carolina (AP-1, UP-2)
 John Collar, NC State (AP-2, UP-1)
 Julius Derrick, South Carolina (AP-2)
 Fred Polzer, Virginia (UP-2)

Tackles
 Mike Sandusky, Maryland (AP-1, UP-1)
 Sid DeLoath, Duke (AP-1, UP-1)
 John Szuchan, NC State (AP-2, UP-2)
 Dick Maraza, Clemson (AP-2)
 Sam DeLuca, South Carolina (UP-2)

Guards
 Jack Davis, Maryland (AP-1, UP-1)
 Jim Jones, North Carolina (AP-1, UP-2)
 John Grdijan, Clemson (AP-2, UP-1)
 Don Kemper, North Carolina (AP-2)
 Bo Claxton, Wake Forest (UP-2)

Centers
 Gene Alderton, Maryland (AP-1, UP-2)
 Jim Keyser, Virginia (AP-2, UP-1)
 Eddie Moore, Wake Forest (AP-2)

Backs
 Billy Ray Barnes, Wake Forest (AP-1, UP-1)
 Joel Wells, Clemson (AP-1, UP-1)
 Jim Bakhtiar, Virginia (AP-1, UP-2)
 Charlie Bussey, Clemson (AP-1, UP-2)
 Ed Sutton, North Carolina (AP-2, UP-1)
 Sonny Jurgenson, North Carolina (AP-2, UP-1)
 Mackie Prickett, South Carolina (AP-2, UP-2)
 Alex Hawkins, South Carolina (AP-2)
 Hal McElhaney, Duke (UP-2)

Key

See also
1956 College Football All-America Team

References

All-Atlantic Coast Conference football team
All-Atlantic Coast Conference football teams